Shakti Soundar Rajan is an Indian film director who predominantly works in Tamil cinema.

Career 
Rajan worked as an assistant director to Venkat Prabhu. His debut movie was Naanayam, released in 2010. In 2014, he directed Naaigal Jaakirathai, which received stellar reviews from both the critics and the audience. After this movie, Shakti achieved a certain stance in the industry. Following a zombie film in Miruthan (2016), and a space film in Tik Tik Tik (2018), Shakti Soundar Rajan returned with one of the country's first live-action animated films, Teddy (2021).

Filmmaking style
Rajan has a reputation for introducing different concepts to Tamil cinema relative to Hollywood films. His second film, Naaigal Jaakirathai, was the first Tamil film to feature a dog as the main protagonist. His third film, Miruthan, was the first Indian film in Tamil language to feature zombies. Rajan's latest venture, Teddy, is also the first Tamil film to use an Indian animation company to design a special animated character and the second Tamil film (after Rajinikanth's Kochadaiiyaan) to use motion-capture technology, marking the new wave of animation usage in Tamil industry.

For his first two films, Rajan has collaborated with music directors James Vasanthan and Dharan Kumar, after which he has collaborated with music director D. Imman for his subsequent films.

Filmography

References

External links 

Tamil film directors
Tamil-language film directors
Living people
Place of birth missing (living people)
1982 births